Abijam was, according to the Hebrew Bible, the fourth king of the House of David and the second of the Kingdom of Judah. He was the son of Rehoboam and the grandson of Solomon. The Books of Chronicles refers to him as Abijah.

In the Hebrew Bible

Family
Abijam is reported in the books of Kings and Chronicles as being the son of Maacah or Micaiah, and father of King Asa of Judah. Some scholars believe the biblical accounts of Abijam's family to be contradictory; however, a study of Hebrew linguistics may remove any seeming contradictions. One of the alleged contradictions is that Maacah is sometimes described as the daughter of Absalom, and elsewhere the daughter of Uriel. Absalom is described as only having one daughter, Tamar.  Apologists have countered by arguing that in Hebrew, "daughter" and "granddaughter" are the same word. Similarly, Maacah is initially described as Abijah's mother, but subsequently described as the mother of his son Asa.  Apologists argue similarly for the ambiguity of the term "mother".  Abijah married fourteen wives, and had 22 sons and 16 daughters. No attempted harmonization has found acceptance with scholars.

Reign
Following the death of Rehoboam, his son Abijah succeeded the throne as King of Judah. He began his three-year reign (2 Chr. 12:16; 13:1, 2) with a strenuous but unsuccessful effort to bring back the ten tribes of the northern Kingdom of Israel to their allegiance,  a path which in  his father had chosen not to follow.

Following Abijah's ascension to the throne in the 18th year of King Jeroboam I of Israel, he marched north with the purpose of winning Israel back to the Davidic kingdom. Jeroboam surrounded Abijah's army, engaging in the Battle of Mount Zemaraim. There Abijah rallied his troops with a phrase which has since become famous: "God Himself is with us for a Captain". Abijah went on to capture the Israelite cities of Jeshanah, Ephron (et-Taiyibeh) and Bethel.

Commentaries
Non-conformist minister Alexander Maclaren considers Abijah "a wiser and better man than his father".

According to the Deuteronomist, "God gave him a lamp in Jerusalem by raising up a son to succeed him" (1 Kings 15:4). The wording in the Septuagint is "the Lord gave him a remnant". Thus the unconditional covenant blessing of YHWH guaranteed his promise to King David, to stabilize the Kingdom of David despite its ruler. The Chronicler also emphasizes YHWH's promise as seen by Abijah's success against every effort by Jeroboam to defeat him:

Judah prevailed because they relied upon the Lord God of their fathers. (2 Chr. 13:18)

God had given the Kingdom to David and his descendants (1 Chronicles 17:14) by a covenant of salt, meaning, of permanence (cf. Leviticus 2:13).

Rabbinic literature
Although Abijah took up God's cause against Jeroboam, the idolatrous king of Israel, he was not permitted to enjoy the fruits of his victory over the latter for any considerable time, dying as he did shortly after his campaign (Josephus, "Ant." viii. 11, § 3). The rabbis recount many transgressions committed by Abijah against his fellow men, which resulted in drawing God's vengeance upon him more speedily than upon Jeroboam's idolatries. Thus it is stated that he mutilated the corpses of Jeroboam's soldiers, and even would not permit them to be interred until they had arrived at a state of putrefaction. Nor did Abijah show himself zealous in God's cause after all; for when, by the conquest of Bethel (II Chron. xiii. 19), the golden calves came into his possession, he did not destroy them as the law (Deut. vii. 25) enjoined. The rabbis also point out that it was improper for Abijah to accuse the whole of Israel of idolatry and to proclaim the appointment of Jeroboam as king to have been the work of "vain men, the children of Belial" (II Chron. xiii. 7), since in point of fact it was the prophet Ahijah, the Shilonite, who prophesied that Jeroboam would be king (I Kings, xi. 37). For these reasons Abijah's reign was a short one.

Chronological discrepancies

William F. Albright has dated his reign to 915–913 BCE.

E. R. Thiele offers the dates 914/913 – 911/910 BCE. As explained in the Rehoboam article, Thiele's chronology for the first kings of Judah contained an internal inconsistency which later scholars corrected by dating these kings one year earlier, so that Abijah's dates are taken as 915/914 to 912/911 BCE in the present article.

Notes

References

Works cited

Further reading
 
 

10th-century BC Kings of Judah
911 BC deaths
Year of birth unknown
Theophoric names